Marcos do Sul Bezerra (born 22 February 1994), commonly known as Marquinhos do Sul, is a Brazilian footballer who plays as a winger for America-RJ on loan from Rio São Paulo.

External links
Marquinhos - Profile on Vasco da Gama

Marquinhos do Sul at ZeroZero

1994 births
Footballers from Rio de Janeiro (city)
Brazilian footballers
Campeonato Brasileiro Série B players
Campeonato Brasileiro Série D players
Association football wingers
CR Vasco da Gama players
Macaé Esporte Futebol Clube players
Associação Desportiva Cabofriense players
Associação Desportiva Bahia de Feira players
Associação Atlética Portuguesa (RJ) players
Club Sportivo Sergipe players
Nova Iguaçu Futebol Clube players
Living people